Ballenstedt/Bode-Selke-Aue was a Verwaltungsgemeinschaft ("collective municipality") in the district of Harz, in Saxony-Anhalt, Germany. The seat of the Verwaltungsgemeinschaft was in Ballenstedt. It was disbanded on 1 January 2010.

The Verwaltungsgemeinschaft Ballenstedt/Bode-Selke-Aue consisted of the following municipalities:

 Ballenstedt
 Ditfurt 
 Hausneindorf 
 Hedersleben 
 Heteborn 
 Radisleben 
 Wedderstedt

References

Former Verwaltungsgemeinschaften in Saxony-Anhalt